The 1999 IBF World Championships (World Badminton Championships) were held in Copenhagen, Denmark, between 10 May and 23 May 1999. During men's single semi final match beteween Fung Permadi and Peter Gade, Permadi made a historical decision. The score was 14 all in the third set with Gade held the match point. Permadi refused to play in deuce. Disturbed by the peculiar, Gade fouled his serve and returned Permadi's serve to the net before losing the match. The same scenario happened in the women final match. Camilla Martin chose not to play the deuce and won against Dai Yun. She was engaged to Gade then and subsequently avenged for her fiancée.

Host city selection
Copenhagen, Denmark, was chosen over Gothenburg, Sweden, as the host for 1999 IBF World Championships.

Medalists

Events

References

External links
http://www.tournamentsoftware.com/sport/events.aspx?id=0C8BEFBC-C502-47FB-8C0B-A57F034F3452
http://www.worldbadminton.com/results/19990518_WorldChampionships/results.htm

 
BWF World Championships
IBF World Championships
Badminton
May 1999 sports events in Europe
International sports competitions in Copenhagen
Badminton tournaments in Denmark
1990s in Copenhagen